CFF Clujana is an association football club from Cluj-Napoca in Romania. Clujana's women's football team played in the top domestic league and has won seven consecutive Romanian national championships and four domestic cups.

History 
CFF Clujana was founded in 2001 by the businessman Florin Chelaru in collaboration with Mirel and Teodora Albon. The team manages to win its first title in 2003 and proceeded to establish itself as the most successful Romanian women's football team of the 2000s, being champions for seven consecutive years between 2003 and 2009, and winning four Romanian Cups.

In 2009, the coach, Mirel Albon, the brain behind the team's success, left the club due to increasingly divergent views with Chelaru. Next year, Albon proceeded to form his own club, taking with him a significant part of Clujana's top players. In the two seasons that followed, rivals Olimpia won the title, while Clujana finished in the bottom part of the championship.

The women's football side ceased in 2012. The parent club was still active in 2018, having a male futsal team since 2005 under the same name CFF Clujana, even though CFF is short for "Women's Football Club", as Chelaru did not bother to officially change the name.

The full name of the club is "Clubul de Fotbal Feminin Clujana Cluj-Napoca", or CFF Clujana Cluj-Napoca. For a while, it was known as CFF Clujana Protherm Cluj-Napoca for sponsorship reasons.

Honours

Leagues
Liga I
Winners (7): 2002–03, 2003–04, 2004–05, 2005–06, 2006–07, 2007–08, 2008–09

Cups
Romanian Women's Cup
Winners (4): 2003–04, 2004–05, 2005–06, 2007–08
Runners-up (2): 2006–07, 2009–10

Season by season

Notable former players

  Teodora Albon
  Mara Bâtea
  Georgiana Birțoiu
  Ioana Bortan
  Cosmina Dușa
  Maria Ficzay
  Adina Giurgiu
  Daniela Gurz
  Andreea Laiu
  Corina Olar
  Elena Pavel
  Florentina Spânu
  Raluca Sârghe
  Ștefania Vătafu
  Andreea Voicu

References

External links
 CFF Clujana - official website 

Sport in Cluj-Napoca
Association football clubs established in 2001
Women's football clubs in Romania
2001 establishments in Romania
Association football clubs disestablished in 2012
2012 disestablishments in Romania
Defunct football clubs in Romania